The 2022 season was Suwon Samsung Bluewings's 27th season in the K League 1 in South Korea. They competed in the 2022 K League 1 and the FA Cup.

Kits
Supplier: Puma / Sponsor: Samsung Neo QLED / Rear sponsor: Deutsch Motors / Sleeve Partner: Galaxy S22 Series, Suwon City

Management team

Players

Squad information
Players, squad numbers and age updated as of 10 September 2022.Note: Flags indicate national team as has been defined under FIFA eligibility rules. Players may hold more than one non-FIFA nationality.

Transfers

Released

Loans in

Loans out

Transfers in

Transfers out

Friendlies

Competitions

Overview

K League 1

League table

Results summary

Results by round

Matches
All times are Korea Standard Time (KST) – UTC+9

Promotion-relegation play-offs
As the tenth-placed team of the K League 1, Suwon Samsung Bluewings played against the third-placed team of the 2022 K League 2, FC Anyang, over two legs. The winner earned a place in the 2023 K League 1.

Suwon Samsung Bluewings won 2–1 on aggregate.

FA Cup

The draw for the first five rounds was held on 7 February 2022.

Statistics

Appearances

Goalscorers

Top assists
Assists counted for the K League 1 matches only.

Discipline

References

Suwon Samsung Bluewings seasons
Suwon Samsung Bluewings